The Aerochute International Dual, (formerly called the Two Seater) is an Australian powered parachute designed and produced by Aerochute International of Coburg North, Victoria. The aircraft is supplied as a kit for amateur construction.

Design and development
It features a  Ram Air brand parachute-style wing made from rip-stop nylon, two-seats-in-side-by-side configuration, tricycle landing gear and a single  Rotax 503 engine mounted  in pusher configuration.

The aircraft carriage is built from metal tubing. The flight controls are a foot pedal throttle, with handles for the canopy brakes, creating roll and yaw. The main landing gear incorporates spring rod suspension.

Specifications (Dual)

References

External links
Official website

Dual
2000s Australian sport aircraft
2000s Australian ultralight aircraft
Single-engined pusher aircraft
Powered parachutes